Melanie Murray is a Canadian author.

She was born in the Northumberland Strait Peninsula of Malagash, Nova Scotia where her father worked in the salt mine after he returned from the Second World War. When the mine shut down in the mid-fifties, Murray's father re-enlisted in the military. While he was a soldier at CFB Gagetown in the 1960s, she grew up in PMQ (Permanent Married Quarters) enclave of Oromocto, New Brunswick. 
  
Murray attended the University of New Brunswick to pursue her love of literature. After earning an Honours B.A. in English, a B.Ed., and an M.A. (Canadian Literature), she travelled to British Columbia. Drawn to the temperate climate and fruitful abundance of the Okanagan Valley, Murray settled in Kelowna in 1987 where she has been teaching English at Okanagan College and raising her two sons.

Murray began writing her first book, For Your Tomorrow: The Way of an Unlikely Soldier, after her nephew was killed in Afghanistan in 2007. She felt compelled to write his story, to create meaning out of his life and the chaos of his death. Currently, Murray is writing a book of historical fiction set in late eighteenth century Scotland.

References

External links 

 BookBits Melanie Murray Interview | YouTube
 CBC Radio As It Happens Episode Featuring Melanie Murray

Canadian women novelists
21st-century Canadian novelists
Writers from Nova Scotia
Writers from British Columbia
People from Cumberland County, Nova Scotia
People from Kelowna
Living people
21st-century Canadian women writers
University of New Brunswick alumni
Year of birth missing (living people)